The Mitsubishi 4B4 engine is the newest all-alloy inline four-cylinder engines from Mitsubishi Motors, based on the 4A9 engine from 2004. But in terms of performance it can replace the bigger 4B1 engine.

Engine family characteristics
This new engine was developed in order to satisfy new performance, weight and ecological standards. It is derived from the older 4A91 engine. The cars that employ this engine demonstrate fall mainly in the middle of the pack of city SUVs and CUVs. Peak torque arrives at an unusually low 1800 rpm and maintains a flat plateau up to 4500 rpm.

4B40

Specifications

Applications
 2017–present Mitsubishi Eclipse Cross
 2023–present Mitsubishi Outlander

See also
 List of Mitsubishi engines

References

Mitsubishi Motors engines
Straight-four engines
Gasoline engines by model